Steve Tobin (born 1957, Philadelphia, Pennsylvania) is an American sculptor. Much of his work draws inspiration from nature, and the Christian Science Monitor has described his sculptures as "monuments to the meeting of science and art".

He studied theoretical mathematics at Tulane University, graduating with a B.S. in 1979, and works from a studio/foundry in Bucks County, Pennsylvania. His works have included an igloo fashioned from the windows of M60 Patton combat tanks, and glass cocoons that he hung in a chapel in Antwerp.

In 1993, he created an installation at Retretti in Punkaharju, Finland, an art museum in a series of artificial caves. He filled the caves with tall, "totemic" glass sculptures, and created a "waterfall" from strands of glass. After the exhibition, he ceased to work with glass, stating later that "I retired from glass because I could never top what I did at Retretti".

Five years later, he gave a show at Fuller Museum of Art in Massachusetts featuring bronze castings of Ghanaian termite mounds; he had become interested in Ghana after having an assistant from the country. In 2002, the Page Museum in Los Angeles gave an exhibition of his work titled "Tobin's Naked Earth: Nature as Sculpture", beside the La Brea Tar Pits. The show included the termite mound castings, a metal casting of the root system of a tree, and a sculpture fashioned from bone marrow.

In 2005, Tobin installed what is perhaps his best known work, Trinity Root, originally placed at St. Paul's Chapel in Lower Manhattan, New York City. During the September 11 attacks on the World Trade Center, the chapel had been partly shielded from damage by a 70-year-old sycamore tree. He created a bronze sculpture of the tree's stump and roots, which now sits in front of the church on the corner of Wall Street and Broadway. Tobin financed the $330,000 sculpture himself, taking out a home equity loan to do so.  In December 2015, Trinity Church, who owns the sculpture under an agreement with Tobin, moved the piece from its former location to the site of the church's conference center in West Cornwall, Conn. without the artist's consent. The decision has created controversy, with the artist claiming that the removal was unjustified and damages resulted.

For more than a decade, Tobin also worked with exploding small charges in blocks of clay and then firing the results, some of which were featured at the Payne Gallery of Moravian College.

In 2016, Tobin was the featured artist in Shanghai, China for the Sixth Annual Jing’An International Sculpture Project (JISP) Expo.  His studio shipped 48 bronze and steel sculptures for the installation, including several from his monumental Steel Roots Series.  Tobin's sculptures were sited at several places around the city of Shanghai, including in front of the Shanghai Natural History Museum and at Jing’An Sculpture Park.

References 

1957 births
Living people
Artists from Philadelphia
Tulane University alumni
Sculptors from Pennsylvania
20th-century American sculptors
20th-century American male artists
21st-century American sculptors
21st-century American male artists